The Sir M. Vishweshwaraiah Moti Bagh metro station is  located on the Pink Line of the Delhi Metro. The station was opened on 6 August 2018. Moti Bagh metro is situated on the Ring Road.

History

The station

Station layout

Facilities

Entry/Exit

Connections

Bus
Delhi Transport Corporation and Delhi Transit (Cluster Buses) provides service to bus routes number 392, 392B, 398, 448EXT, 479, 479CL, 529SPL, 543A, 567, 567A, 568, 568A, 569, 588, 611A, 711, 724, 724C, 724EXT, 780, 794, 794A, 864, 874, 984A, AC-479, AC-711, AC-724, AC-724A, TMS (-), TMS-Azadpur-Lajpat, TMS-LajpatNagar, TMS-PBagh serves the station from nearby North Moti Bagh bus stop.

See also

Delhi
List of Delhi Metro stations
Transport in Delhi
Delhi Metro Rail Corporation
Delhi Suburban Railway
Inner Ring Road, Delhi
South Extension
Delhi Monorail
Delhi Transport Corporation
South Delhi
New Delhi
National Capital Region (India)
List of rapid transit systems
List of metro systems

References

External links

 Delhi Metro Rail Corporation Ltd. (Official site)
 Delhi Metro Annual Reports
 
 UrbanRail.Net – descriptions of all metro systems in the world, each with a schematic map showing all stations.

Delhi Metro stations
Railway stations in New Delhi district